The Minor Basilica of Our Lady of the Rosary of Manaoag, also known as Manaoag Church, is a minor basilica located in Manaoag, Pangasinan in the Philippines. Located on top of a hill in the town, the basilica has been canonically affiliated with the Papal Basilica of Saint Mary Major in Rome since June 2011. The parish encompassing Manaoag and the surrounding towns is administered by the Order of Preachers under the Roman Catholic Archdiocese of Lingayen-Dagupan. It was officially declared a Basilica on February 17, 2015.

Some of the miracles attributed to Our Lady of Manaoag are depicted in murals inside the church's transepts and nave. The Paschal Chapel beside the south flank of the church has icons of the Black Nazarene similar to that of the Quiapo Church, the Santo Entierro (Dead Christ), and other statues of the Virgin Mary. The sanctuary on the left side of the main entrance has a large image of the Crucified Christ.

Behind the church are the Parish Office, Blessing Area, Museum of Our Lady of The Rosary of Manaoag, Candle Gallery, Pilgrims’ Center, Dominican Novitiate of the Annunciation, and Rosary Garden. There is also an Information Center at the Priory at the left side of the church and souvenir shops at the front office of the church, beside the Veneration Room at the second floor behind the main sanctuary, and at the Candle Gallery in the space behind of the church.

The National Museum of the Philippines has declared the Minor Basilica of Our Lady of the Most Holy Rosary of Manaoag as one of the National Cultural Treasures. It was declared on December 23, 2016. The declaration recognizes the Minor Basilica and Church Complex of Our Lady of the Most Holy Rosary of Manaoag in Pangasinan, including the image of the Blessed Virgin Mary and movable and intangible properties intrinsic to the cultural significance of the property as national cultural treasures.

History 
The Augustinians built the first Chapel of Santa Monica (the original name of Manaoag) in 1600, at the site of the present graveyard. It was served by the friars from the town of Lingayen, who were succeeded by the Dominicans in 1605 and served from the town of Mangaldan.

The first Dominican priest to work in the Manaoag mission was Juan de San Jacinto, O.P., who was the first curate of Mangaldan. It was only in 1608 that the Mangaldan mission was formally accepted by the provincial chapter of the Dominicans. In 1610, Tomás Jiménez, O.P. became the Manaoag mission's first resident priest.

Numerous threats from the Igorot tribes of the surrounding mountains led to the transfer of the entire community to the present site on a hill. The Dominicans started to build a large church on its present site in 1701 under the sponsorship of Gaspar de Gamboa and his wife, Agata Yangta, who were wealthy residents from Manila who moved to Lingayen. Later expansion of the church from 1882 was frustrated by an earthquake in 1892.

During the tumult of the Philippine Revolution for independence from Spain, revolutionaries set fire to the church, its treasures, ornaments, and records on 10 May 1898. The image narrowly escaped destruction; it was found abandoned at the back of the church. It was spirited away to Dagupan, where it was kept from June to October 1898.

The Dominicans returned in 1901 upon the invitation of Rev. Mariano Pacis, the diocesan priest of Manaoag. Under the aegis of the Dominicans, the church that was started in 1882 was finally completed to a large extent in 1911-12. The central retablo, incorporating Baroque columns from the 18th-century altar, was completed by the famed Tampinco Atelier of Manila. The transepts were completed in 1931-32.

The Dominicans ceded all their Pangasinan missions to the diocesan clergy except Manaoag. Spiritual administration of the shrine in perpetuity was granted by the Holy See to the Order of Preachers in 1925.

A huge crowd attended the Canonical Coronation of the image on 21 April 1926 by then-Apostolic Delegate to the Philippines Guglielmo Piani, S.D.B., as authorized by Pope Pius XI. This meant that the Catholic Church officially recognized and proclaimed that The Virgin Mary acclaimed as Our Lady of The Rosary of Manaoag had granted favors and blessings to or formidable intercessions for her devotees through the centuries.

The church was rebuilt after surviving Japanese bombardment during the Second World War.

The old convento is now the Our Lady of Manaoag College, founded as Holy Rosary Academy in 1946 by the last Spanish Dominican in Manaoag, Rev. Teodulo Cajigal, O.P.

Since 8 December 1972, the Shrine of Our Lady of the Rosary of Manaoag has been under the Philippine Dominican Province. It celebrated the Diamond Jubilee of the image's canonical coronation on 1 January 2000.

Canonical affiliation with Saint Mary Major 
On 21 June 2011, Cardinal Bernard Francis Law, Archpriest of the Papal Basilica of Saint Mary Major in Rome and Pope Benedict XVI canonically approved the granting of a "Special Bond of Spiritual Affinity in Perpetuity" through which the pilgrims are assured of the same blessings and entitlement to a plenary indulgence equal to that received when visiting a papal basilica in Rome. This was confirmed by the prelate (now Archbishop) of the Lingayen-Dagupan, Socrates B. Villegas, in a circular dated June 13, 2011. The Manaoag Shrine is the first to achieve this status followed by the Shrine of Our Lady of Caysasay in Taal, Batangas in June 2012.

The official document and a shrine official, who was among the priests who went to Rome, confirmed that a plenary indulgence (of a maximum of one per day) may be obtained on each visit to the Shrine in a spirit of detachment from the attraction of sin subject to three conditions for each occasion: going to confession immediately before or after the pilgrimage; attending a Mass and receiving the Eucharist during the pilgrimage; and praying for the intentions of the Pope at the Shrine.

Elevation to basilica 
In February 2015, the Shrine of Our Lady of The Rosary of Manaoag was elevated to a minor basilica in a ceremony attended by more than 100 archbishops and bishops, leaders of church and state, and numerous devotees. The Shrine was henceforth called the Basilica of Our Lady of The Rosary of Manaoag, headed by a rector appointed by the Archbishop of Lingayen-Dagupan.  A special Mass was also held to affirm the "Special Bond of Spiritual Affinity in Perpetuity" between the Manaoag Shrine and the Papal Basilica of Saint Mary Major in Rome.

Access and transportation 

From Metro Manila, Manaoag is accessible via North Luzon Expressway, MacArthur Highway and Tarlac–Pangasinan–La Union Expressway via the Binalonan Exit and westward to nearby Manaoag; or through Urdaneta City, Pangasinan, then heading northwest via the Urdaneta-Manaoag Road, or through Binalonan via the Binalonan-Manaoag-Mangaldan Road. The basilica is four to five hours by bus from Cubao, Quezon City.

Gallery

See also
Our Lady of Manaoag

References

Basilica churches in the Philippines
Roman Catholic churches in Pangasinan
Dominican churches in the Philippines
Churches in the Roman Catholic Archdiocese of Lingayen–Dagupan